Air Mauritius is the flag carrier airline of Mauritius. The airline is headquartered in Port Louis, Mauritius, with its hub based at Sir Seewoosagur Ramgoolam International Airport. The company was placed in voluntary administration on 22 April 2020 in wake of the COVID-19 pandemic and exited administration mid-2021.

History

Foundation

In the beginning, the carrier operated international services in conjunction with Air France, Air India and British Airways, which jointly had a 25% holding in Air Mauritius at that time. Until 1972, the company restricted its activities to ground services only; it started flight operations in its own right in August 1972 with a six-seater Piper PA-31 Navajo aircraft leased from Air Madagascar, connecting Mauritius with Rodrigues. The aircraft wore an Air Mauritius decor, but kept a Malagasy registration.

In 1973, a wet-leased Vickers VC10 from British Airways enabled the company to launch a long-haul route to London via Nairobi, whereas services to Bombay were operated by Air India. The Navajo was replaced with a 16-seater Twin Otter that was acquired in 1975. When an agreement with Air France and British Airways came to an end, a Boeing 707-400 wet-leased from British Airtours helped the airline to start long-haul services in its own right. A second Twin Otter arrived in 1979.

Services expansion
By , the company had 414 employees and a fleet of one Boeing 707-420, one Boeing 737-200 and two Twin Otters to serve a route network of passenger and cargo services to Bombay, London, Nairobi, Réunion, Rodrigues, Rome and Tananarive. Ownership of the company had changed to have the government of Mauritius as the major shareholder (42.5%), followed by Rogers & Co. (17.5%), Air France and British Airways (15% each) and Air India (10%). Air Mauritius acquired a second-hand Boeing 707-320B in 1981. It had previously belonged to South African Airways (SAA), and permitted the airline to return the Boeing 707-400 to British Airtours. In , a joint service between Air Mauritius and Air Madagascar began in the Tananarive–Mauritius–Comoros–Nairobi and Réunion–Mauritius runs, following the lease of an Air Madagascar Boeing 737. During the early 1980s, routes to Durban and Johannesburg were inaugurated using Boeing 707-320B aircraft flown with Air India and British Airways crews. The incorporation of a second aircraft of the type, bought from Luxavia, allowed the carrier to expand the European route network to Rome and Zurich in 1983, whereas Paris was added in the mid-1980s. By , the fleet comprised two Boeing 707-320Bs, a Boeing 737-200, a Boeing 747SP and a Twin Otter. That month, the first of two Bell 206 JetRangers was incorporated. In , a 46-seater ATR 42 was ordered, and Singapore was added to the route network with a weekly service using Boeing 707 equipment. In  that year, Air Mauritius joined the African Airlines Association. The carrier made a profit of GBP3.5 million for the fiscal year 1985–86.

In 1986, a second Boeing 747SP that was also leased from SAA entered the fleet; it was named ″Chateau Mon Plaisir″. The incorporation of this aircraft allowed the carrier to phase out a Boeing 707. In 1987, South African Airways' landing rights on Australian soil were suspended by the Australian government and Qantas ceased its operations in South Africa. There had been an increase in demand from businessmen since that time, as most passengers travelling from South Africa to Australia had to stop at Hong Kong, Taipei or Singapore.

Fleet modernisation

These aircraft were named ″City of Port Louis″ and ″City of Curepipe″. A contract worth  million including spare parts for these two Boeing 767s had been signed a year earlier.

By , the route network included Antananarivo, Bombay, Durban, Geneva, Harare, Hong Kong, Johannesburg, Kuala Lumpur, London, Moroni, Munich, Nairobi, Paris, Reunion, Rodrigues, Rome, Singapore and Zurich. The airline became the first in the Southern Hemisphere to fly the A340-300. The airline started trading on the Stock Exchange of Mauritius during the year. In 1996, the last Boeing 747SP was sold to Qatar Airways and direct flights to Manchester were launched.

Recent years

At , Air Mauritius had 2,000 employees. At this time, the airline had a fleet of five Airbus A340-300s, one ATR42-300, two ATR42-500s and two Boeing 767-200ERs that served a route network including Antananarivo, Brussels, Cape Town, Delhi, Durban, Frankfurt, Geneva, Harare, Hong Kong, Johannesburg, Kuala Lumpur, London, Mahe Island, Manchester, Maputo, Mauritius, Melbourne, Milan, Mumbai, Munich, Paris, Perth, Rodrigues Island, Rome, Singapore, St Denis de la Reunion, St Pierre de la Reunion, Vienna and Zürich. African medium-haul routes started utilising the Airbus A319 following its delivery in 2001. The A340-300 Enhanced version was ordered by the carrier in mid-2005. The A340-300 Enhanced was put on service on the London Heathrow route in December 2006, soon after delivery.

In March 2016, Air Mauritius launched the 'Air Corridor' with its first direct flights to Singapore, which was previously served via Kuala Lumpur. The new route aimed at improving air connectivity between Mauritius and Singapore in order to stimulate the growth of passenger and cargo traffic between Asia and Africa through these two hubs.

Corporate affairs

On 22 April 2020, the board of directors took the decision to place the Company under voluntary administration after coronavirus-related disruptions made it impossible for the airline to meet its financial obligations for the foreseeable future. The pandemic had a major impact on the revenue of the company while it was seeking to change its business model to address existing financial problems. The company will continue its operation, this decision was taken to safeguard the interest of the company and its stakeholders.

Key people
 Dev Manraj, G.O.S.K held the chairman position and BUTON Indradev was the officer in charge. Dev Manraj was a key figure in the MCB-NPF financial scandal which came to light in 2003. In December 2022, Krešimir Kučko, former Croatia Airlines and Gulf Air CEO, was appointed CEO of Air Mauritius.

Ownership and subsidiaries
Air Mauritius was the first Mauritian company with its majority owned by the state that made their shares public. Listing was granted in November 1994 and share trading on the stock exchange of Mauritius commenced in February 1995. , shareholders having more than 5% of direct participation in the airline were Air Mauritius Holdings Ltd. (51%) and the government of Mauritius (8.37%), while other investors held the remaining stake. Air Mauritius Holdings Ltd. was in turn owned in its majority (43.83%) by the Mauritian Government. Air Mauritius Limited's wholly owned subsidiaries were Airmate Ltd., Air Mauritius Holidays Ltd., Air Mauritius Holidays (Pty) Ltd. Australia, Air Mauritius Institute Co. Ltd., Air Mauritius SA (Proprietary) Ltd., Mauritian Holidays Ltd. (UK) and Mauritius Helicopters Ltd.; partly owned subsidiaries were Mauritius Estate Development Corporation Ltd. (93.7%), Pointe Coton Resort Hotel Company Ltd. (54.2%), and Mauritius Shopping Paradise Company Ltd. (41.7%).

Business trends
The key trends for Air Mauritius over recent years are shown below (as at year ending 31 March):

Headquarters
, Air Mauritius had its headquarters at Air Mauritius Centre in Port Louis, Mauritius.

Controversies
Air Mauritius was the focus of a politico-financial scandal known as the Caisse Noire Affair. As a result of the investigation which lasted from 2001 to 2015 several senior members of its management including Gérard Tyack, Sir Harry Tirvengadum and others were prosecuted. Gérard Tyack was jailed.

Destinations 

In , the carrier signed a cooperation agreement with Air Austral, Air Madagascar, Air Seychelles and Inter Ile Air that established Vanilla Alliance and is aimed at improving air services between the Indian Ocean Commission members.

, Air Mauritius served 22 destinations from its hub in Sir Seewoosagur Ramgoolam International Airport, three of them domestic.

Codeshare agreements
Air Mauritius has codeshare agreements with the following airlines:

 Air Austral
 Air France
 Air India
 Air Madagascar
 Emirates
 Hong Kong Airlines
 Kenya Airways
 Malaysia Airlines
 Singapore Airlines
 South African Airways
 Virgin Australia

Frequent flyer programme
Air Mauritius' frequent flyer programme is called Kestrelflyer, which offers Silver and Gold accounts.

Fleet

Recent developments and future plans
In , during the Farnborough Air Show, it was announced Air Mauritius signed a memorandum of understanding with Airbus for six Airbus A350-900s, of which two will be leased from AerCap Holdings and with the option to place additional orders for up to three more aircraft of the type between 2023 and 2025. It was originally planned that the leased aircraft would join the fleet by the end 2017 and the other four would join in 2019 and 2020.

In , Air Mauritius announced that it would be leasing two Airbus A330-900 aircraft from Air Lease Corporation to replace two Airbus A340-300E aircraft from September and October 2018. Due to delays from Airbus, these aircraft were delivered in April and June 2019. The two Airbus A350-900 that were due to be delivered in 2020, were pushed back to 2023. It was also announced that the airline's existing aircraft would be refurbished with new seats, new inflight entertainment systems and onboard Wi-Fi. The revamp of the cabin interiors was planned to be completed by June 2018. The two Airbus A350-900s that were due to join the fleet in 2019 were sublet to South African Airlines for 3 years. In August 2020, these aircraft were returned early by SAA, due to financial difficulties.

In July 2021, the airline completed the sale of its two Airbus A319 and remaining Airbus A340 aircraft. The retirement of the Airbus A340 marked the end of 27 years of service of the fleet type with the airline. The retirement of the two Airbus A330-200 from the fleet was completed by end of November 2021.

Current fleet
, the Air Mauritius fleet consisted of the following aircraft:

The airline also operates two Bell 206 JetRanger helicopters that are used for tour services.

Former fleet
The airline previously operated the following aircraft:

 Airbus A319-100
 Airbus A330-200
 Airbus A340-300
 ATR 42-300
 ATR 42-500
 Boeing 707-320B
 Boeing 707-420
 Boeing 737-200
 Boeing 747SP
 Boeing 747-200B
 Boeing 767-200ER
 Boeing 767-300ER
 de Havilland Canada DHC-6 Twin Otter
 Lockheed L-1011-500

See also

 List of airlines of Mauritius
 Transport in Mauritius

References

Bibliography

External links

Airlines of Mauritius
Airlines established in 1967
Government-owned airlines
1967 establishments in Mauritius
Vanilla Alliance
Government-owned companies of Mauritius
Companies based in Port Louis